Helix is a city in Umatilla County, Oregon, United States. The population was 184 at the 2010 census. It is part of the Pendleton–Hermiston Micropolitan Statistical Area.

History
Helix, a geometry term and a part of the ear, was originally to be named Oxford, but authorities declined that option when the community's post office was to be named in 1880.  The citizens then decided on Helix since a resident had recently had ear surgery. The author of Oregon Geographic Names, Lewis A. McArthur, had his doubts about the story.

Geography

Demographics

2010 census
As of the census of 2010, there were 184 people, 55 households, and 46 families living in the city. The racial makeup of the city was 81.0% White, 8.7% Native American, 3.8% from other races, and 6.5% from two or more races. Hispanic or Latino of any race were 6.0% of the population.

There were 55 households, of which 43.6% had children under the age of 18 living with them, 63.6% were married couples living together, 10.9% had a female householder with no husband present, 9.1% had a male householder with no wife present, and 16.4% were non-families. 9.1% of all households were made up of individuals, and 1.8% had someone living alone who was 65 years of age or older. The average household size was 3.35 and the average family size was 3.54.

The median age in the city was 35.7 years. 34.8% of residents were under the age of 18; 6.5% were between the ages of 18 and 24; 26.1% were from 25 to 44; 21.3% were from 45 to 64; and 11.4% were 65 years of age or older. The gender makeup of the city was 51.6% male and 48.4% female.

2000 census
As of the census of 2000, there were 183 people, 62 households, and 46 families living in the city. The population density was 1,600.5 people per square mile (642.3/km2). There were 68 housing units at an average density of 594.7 per square mile (238.7/km2). The racial makeup of the city was 94.54% White, 2.19% Native American, 0.55% from other races, and 2.73% from two or more races. Hispanic or Latino of any race were 2.73% of the population.

There were 62 households, out of which 48.4% had children under the age of 18 living with them, 62.9% were married couples living together, 8.1% had a female householder with no husband present, and 24.2% were non-families. 19.4% of all households were made up of individuals, and 8.1% had someone living alone who was 65 years of age or older. The average household size was 2.95 and the average family size was 3.47.

In the city, the population was spread out, with 38.8% under the age of 18, 3.8% from 18 to 24, 31.1% from 25 to 44, 14.8% from 45 to 64, and 11.5% who were 65 years of age or older. The median age was 30 years. For every 100 females, there were 105.6 males. For every 100 females age 18 and over, there were 93.1 males.

The median income for a household in the city was $32,292, and the median income for a family was $36,250. Males had a median income of $33,750 versus $27,500 for females. The per capita income for the city was $13,338. About 14.3% of families and 13.6% of the population were below the poverty line, including 19.2% of those under the age of 18 and 6.3% of those 65 or over.

Economy
Helix School is the predominant employer within the city.

The immediate land surrounding Helix is used almost exclusively for dryland farming.  The predominant crop is wheat with canola or peas used as a cover crop and break crop.  The Stateline Wind Farm and Vansycle Wind Project are nearby.

Arts and culture

Annual cultural events
The city is home to the Helix Heart of the Country Rodeo held each Memorial Day weekend.

The city also hosts the annual Wheatstock music festival during August.

Notable people
 Raymond F. Rees, former Adjutant General of Oregon
 Lowell Stockman, representative from Oregon to the United States House of Representatives from 1943 to 1953

References

External links
 Entry for Helix in the Oregon Blue Book
 Photo of children in Helix in 1922, courtesy of Bill Tozier
 Heart of the Country Rodeo
 Wheatstock Music Festival

Cities in Oregon
Cities in Umatilla County, Oregon
Pendleton–Hermiston Micropolitan Statistical Area
1880 establishments in Oregon
Populated places established in 1880